Nocturne: Blue and Gold – Old Battersea Bridge is a painting by the American artist James McNeill Whistler, now held in the collections of Tate Britain. It was painted around 1872–1875.

This painting is of the old wooden Battersea Bridge across the River Thames before it was replaced by the modern bridge. Chelsea Old Church to the left (on the north bank of the river) and the then recently built Albert Bridge to the right, with fireworks above, can be seen in the distance. The picture is an evening view and is full of atmospheric effect. The bridge is painted taller than it actually was for added effect. Hokusai, a favorite artist of Whistler's from Japan, produced a similar picture of a tall wooden bridge with fireworks.

Whistler's Nocturne series, of which this painting was a part, achieved notoriety in 1877, when influential critic John Ruskin visited an exhibition of the series at the Grosvenor Gallery. He wrote of the exhibition that Whistler was "asking two hundred guineas for flinging a pot of paint in the public's face". Whistler sued for libel, the case reaching the courts in 1878. The judge in the case, one Baron Huddleston, caused laughter in the court when he (apparently sincerely) asked Whistler "Which part of the picture is the bridge?"  The case ended with Whistler awarded token damages of one farthing.

In 1905, Nocturne: Blue and Gold became the first significant acquisition by the newly formed National Art Collections Fund and was presented to the Tate Gallery. It now hangs in Tate Britain.

References

 Bibliography

External links 
 Tate Collection information
 John Singer Sargent Virtual Gallery information

1870s paintings
Collection of the Tate galleries
Paintings by James Abbott McNeill Whistler
Maritime paintings
Bridges in art